The 19th Vietnam Film Festival was held from December 1 to December 5, 2015, in Ho Chi Minh City, Vietnam, with the slogan "Vietnamese Cinema - Ethnicity, Humanity, Creativity, Integration" (Vietnamese: "Điện ảnh Việt Nam - Dân tộc, Nhân văn, Sáng tạo, Hội nhập").

Event 
At this Film Festival, for the first time, there is a selection round for entries in all genres: feature films, documentaries, science films and animated films. Also for the first time, films participating in the Vietnam Film Festival are divided into categories: films in Competition and films in the Panorama program. For the first time, the model of film production ordered by the State combined with the social capital of private film studios achieved high social and economic efficiency.

The jury awarded 4 Golden Lotus for the categories: Feature Film, Documentary, Science Film and Animated Film.

Participation 
Notably, the 2015 Vietnam Film Festival was the first time that a selection committee was established to select films for competition and show, not all units sent to participate.

From hundreds of films submitted for selection, the 19th Film Festival's Selection Committee has selected 125 films of various genres, from 41 film production units across the country to be included in 2 sections: “Films in Competition” (92 films) and “Films shown in the Panorama program” (33 films).

Among the 92 entries, there are 20 feature films, 6 direct-to-video feature films, 6 documentary feature films, 27 direct-to-video documentary, 10 science films, and 23 animated films. Films for this year's competition are films produced by cinema establishments and licensed for popularization from September 1, 2013, to October 10, 2015.

The new feature of this film festival is the Panorama Program section (Vietnamese: "Toàn cảnh điện ảnh Việt Nam"). The program will show to the public the films that attended the festival but were not eligible and not selected for the competition list (15 feature films and 18 direct-to-video documentary films). However, there are still 2 award for the most favorite film in this section along with the "Film In Competition" section, voted by the audience.

In addition, to celebrate the 85th anniversary of the founding of Vietnam Communist Party, 40 years of Southern Liberation Day - National Reunification and 70 years of August Revolution and National Day, the General Department of Politics of the Vietnam People's Army (Vietnamese: Tổng cục chính trị Quân đội nhân dân Việt Nam) had given the award for the "Best Film on War and Revolution".

Jury 
This year's film festival continues to have 3 jury panels like previous years.

The jury in the Feature Film category includes: director Vũ Xuân Hưng (Head), director/actor Lê Cung Bắc, director Đặng Tất Bình, writer Nguyễn Đông Thức, screenwriter Lưu Nghiệp Quỳnh, composer Phú Quang, cinematographer Vũ Đức Tùng, painter Lã Quý Tùng and actress Vân Trang.

In the Documentary - Scientific Film category, the jury includes: Doctor/Film Critic Trần Luân Kim (Head), director Vũ Lệ Mỹ, director/cinematographer Nguyễn Quốc Thành, journalist Ngô Ngọc Ngũ Long and director Đoàn Hồng Lê.

In the Documentary - Scientific Film category, there are 5 members of the jury: director/animator Nguyễn Hà Bắc (Head), director/animator Nguyễn Thị Phương Hoa, writer Đoàn Thạch Biền, songwriter Nguyễn Quỳnh Hợp and journalist Chu Thị Thu Hằng.

Activities 
A notable activity to prepare for the film festival is the Welcoming 19th Vietnam Film Festival Film Week. The opening starts at 19:30 pm on November 18, 2015, at the National Cinema Center (Hanoi) with the film "Cuộc đời của Yến" and Lê Độ Cinema (Đà Nẵng City) with the film "Người trở về".

According to the schedule, there will be two seminars to take place:
"Brand building, position of Vietnamese films" (Vietnamese: "Xây dựng thương hiệu, vị thế của phim Việt Nam")
"Supporting policies and preferential measures for the development of the film industry" (Vietnamese: "Chính sách hỗ trợ và biện pháp ưu đãi phát triển nền công nghiệp điện ảnh"), with the participation of speakers, filmmakers from UK, USA, Denmark, Canada, Hong Kong (China), Philippines and Vietnam

Along with that, there were 3 exchanges including:
Film artists with students
Film artists with soldiers of the Division 9, Corps 4 in Củ Chi
Meeting with artists participating in works on the theme of Liberation of the South and reunification of the country.

In Ho Chi Minh City, during the five days of the festival (from December 1 to December 5), in addition to feature films in the competition section, the audience also enjoyed free films in the Panorama Program section at BHD cinemas (February 3 Street, District 10), CGV Hùng Vương (District 5), Galaxy Nguyễn Du (District 1), Mega GS Cao Thắng (District 3). According to the organizers, tickets for the welcome film week as well as at the festival are distributed at the screening venue 1–2 days before each film is shown.

The opening ceremony took place at 19:00 on December 1 at Hòa Bình Theater (Ho Chi Minh City), broadcast live on channel VTV1. The closing/awarding ceremony took place at Hoa Binh Theater at 20:00 on December 5, which will be broadcast live on channel VTV6.

Critical Reviews 
The 19th Vietnam Film Festival received more positive reviews than previous festivals. The plus point for the 19th Vietnam Film Festival is that it has selected many good films to participate in the competition. Through the selection round, the categories of films submitted to the competition were diverse, with many quality films appearing and avoiding the "catastrophic" films like many previous festival seasons.

In particular, the maturity of the young film crew has added a new voice next to the previous seniors. Another factor is that overseas Vietnamese filmmakers return to their home country to establish their careers, making the Vietnamese film market more vibrant and remarkable.

Official Selection

Feature film

In Competition 

Highlighted title indicates Golden Lotus winner.

Panorama Program 

Highlighted title indicates the most favorite film voted by the audience.

Awards

Feature film

Direct-to-video

Documentary/Science film

Documentary film

Science film

Animated film

References 

Vietnam Film Festival
Vietnam Film Festival
Vietnam Film Festival
2015 in Vietnam
December 2015 events in Vietnam